Cyprus participated at the 2017 Summer Universiade, in Taipei, Taiwan with 27 competitors in 7 sports.

Competitors
The following table lists Cyprus's delegation per sport and gender.

Medal summary

Athletics

Track Events

Field Events

Fencing

Gymnastics

Artistic
Individual

Team

Judo

Taekwondo

Tennis

Volleyball

Men's tournament
Group Stage

|}

|}

17th–22nd place quarterfinals

|}

17th–20th place semifinals

|}

19th place match

|}

References

External links
Universiade Taipei 2017
Canada Overview

Nations at the 2017 Summer Universiade
2017 in Cypriot sport